Social Democratic Path (sometimes written as Democratic and Social Path; ; , or al-Massar) is a centre-left secularist political party in Tunisia. It was formed on 1 April 2012, by the merger of the post-communist Ettajdid Movement and the Tunisian Labour Party, including some individual members of the Democratic Modernist Pole, together holding 7 seats in the Constituent Assembly. It is led by Ahmed Brahim, former secretary of the Ettajdid Movement. On 11 February 2013, it became a part of the Union for Tunisia alliance of secularist parties.

References

2012 establishments in Tunisia
Social democratic parties in Africa
Feminist parties in Africa
Political parties established in 2012
Secularism in Tunisia
Social democratic parties in Tunisia
Feminist organisations in Tunisia